The Hannam Bridge is a girder bridge over the Han River, South Korea. It connects Sinsa-dong, Gangnam-gu and Hannam-dong, Yongsan-gu. The bridge is heavily congested with traffic, with both gu being busy business districts. It was called the Hangang Bridge No. 3 (Jesamhanganggyo; hangul: 제3한강교) until 1985, when its name was changed to the current name. A trot song "Jesamhanggyo" was popularized by Hye Eun-Yi in 1979.

It is a part of the Asian Highway Network .

References

External links

Bridges in Seoul
Bridges completed in 1969